Joseph Wood may refer to:
 Joseph Wood (congressman) (1712–1791), American planter and Continental Congressman for Georgia
 Joseph Wood (painter) (c. 1778–1830), American painter
 Joseph Wood (Wisconsin politician) (1809–1890), American pioneer and Wisconsin state legislator
 Joseph Wood (schoolmaster) (1841–1923), English headmaster of Harrow and other schools
 Joseph D. Wood, mayor of Norfolk, Virginia
 Joseph Garnett Wood (1900–1959), Australian professor of botany 
 Joseph M. Wood, head coach of the University of Virginia college football program, 1914
 Joseph R. Wood (1915–2000), American composer
 Joseph Rudolph Wood (1958–2014), American murderer whose prolonged execution has created some controversy

See also
 Joe Wood (disambiguation)
 Joseph Woods (disambiguation)